The Japanese Imperial Army had Independent Infantry Brigades, which were formed as garrison units mostly in China late in World War II.

List of Japanese Imperial Army Independent Infantry Brigades
 1st Independent Infantry Brigade 
 2nd Independent Infantry Brigade
 3rd Independent Infantry Brigade
 4th Independent Infantry Brigade 
 5th Independent Infantry Brigade
 6th Independent Infantry Brigade
 7th Independent Infantry Brigade 
 8th Independent Infantry Brigade
 9th Independent Infantry Brigade
 10th Independent Infantry Brigade 
 11th Independent Infantry Brigade
 13th Independent Infantry Brigade
 14th Independent Infantry Brigade

Sources 

 抗日战争时期的侵华日军序列沿革 (Order of battle of the Japanese army that invaded China during the Sino Japanese War)

Japanese World War II brigades
World War II-related lists by country